Saint-Germain-des-Bois is a commune in the Cher department in the Centre-Val de Loire region of France.

Geography
The A71 autoroute passes through the northwestern part of the commune.

Population

Sights
 The church of St. Germain, dating from the twelfth century.
 Traces of a Roman road.
 Two neolithic menhirs.

See also
Communes of the Cher department

References

External links

Official commune website 
Annuaire Mairie 

Communes of Cher (department)